Marianowo may refer to:

Marianowo, Rypin County in Kuyavian-Pomeranian Voivodeship (north-central Poland)
Marianowo, Gmina Strzegowo in Masovian Voivodeship (east-central Poland)
Marianowo, Podlaskie Voivodeship (north-east Poland)
Marianowo, Gmina Szydłowo in Masovian Voivodeship (east-central Poland)
Marianowo, Gmina Wieczfnia Kościelna in Masovian Voivodeship (east-central Poland)
Marianowo, Przasnysz County in Masovian Voivodeship (east-central Poland)
Marianowo, Wyszków County in Masovian Voivodeship (east-central Poland)
Marianowo, Czarnków-Trzcianka County in Greater Poland Voivodeship (west-central Poland)
Marianowo, Gmina Sompolno in Greater Poland Voivodeship (west-central Poland)
Marianowo, Gmina Ślesin in Greater Poland Voivodeship (west-central Poland)
Marianowo, Międzychód County in Greater Poland Voivodeship (west-central Poland)
Marianowo, Szamotuły County in Greater Poland Voivodeship (west-central Poland)
Marianowo, Środa Wielkopolska County in Greater Poland Voivodeship (west-central Poland)
Marianowo, Śrem County in Greater Poland Voivodeship (west-central Poland)
Marianowo, Lubusz Voivodeship (west Poland)
Marianowo, Pomeranian Voivodeship (north Poland)
Marianowo, West Pomeranian Voivodeship (north-west Poland)